Dalbergia campenonii is a species of legume in the family Fabaceae.
It is found only in Madagascar.

Sources

campenonii
Endemic flora of Madagascar
Vulnerable plants
Taxonomy articles created by Polbot
Taxobox binomials not recognized by IUCN